Ava White was a 12-year-old girl who was murdered by a 14-year-old boy on 25 November 2021, in the English city of Liverpool. She was stabbed after a row over a Snapchat video. The boy has not been named for legal reasons.

Background 
Ava was a student of Notre Dame Catholic College in Everton.

Murder 
On 25 November 2021, Ava and her friends, aged between 11 and 15 were playing and sharing alcohol near the Royal Court Theatre, Liverpool while waiting for the switching on of the Christmas lights.

A teenage boy and his friends, aged between 13 and 15 started filming them with intent to share it on Snapchat. Ava aggressively asked them to stop and delete the recording. The unarmed girls ran towards and the teenage boy stabbed her in the neck with a knife, laughed and ran away.

She was taken to Alder Hey Children's Hospital but died shortly after.

Following a two-week trial at Liverpool Crown Court, the boy who had initially denied murdering Ava by saying it was another boy, later claimed to have acted in self-defence. The court was shown CCTV footage, police recorded interviews were presented and a 20-second clip showing the stabbing were played during the trial of the boy. Her friends also testified. Among the footage presented in court is of him and a friend throwing away his coat and knife as they ran from the scene of the murder.

He was found guilty of murder and was sentenced to life imprisonment with a minimum term of 13 years.

Ava was murdered on International Day for the Elimination of Violence against Women. She is believed to be the youngest victim of knife violence in the UK since Damilola Taylor in 2000.

Memorial 
 On 2 December 2021, Everton F.C. and Liverpool F.C. fans joined in a round of applause as a banner with an anti-knives message was displayed during the game.
 On 23 January 2022, a crowd bringing along balloons of the figure 13 or the letter A gathered outside Anfield stadium and sang songs in memory of Ava.

See also 
 Killing of Damilola Taylor

References 

2021 murders in the United Kingdom
Murder in Liverpool
November 2021 events in the United Kingdom
Murder trials
Juvenile delinquency
Knife attacks
Snap Inc.